Lakshman Bandara Kiriella, MP (born 2 February 1948) is a Sri Lankan politician and lawyer. He is a Member of Parliament from the Kandy District, former Leader of the House of the parliament. Also he held office as Minister of Public Enterprises and Kandy Development and as Minister of Higher Education and Highways from 2015 to 2019. 

Educated at Royal College, Colombo and Sri Lanka Law College, he became a practicing lawyer before entering politics.  He has elected to Parliament in 1989, he has been a Member ever since. He has served as the Minister of Tourism and Sports and the Deputy minister of Foreign Affairs. In 2015 he was appointed as the Leader of the House of the United National Party Government under Prime Minister Ranil Wickramasinghe.

He is married to Charmaine Jayawardena and they have two daughters, Kishanee and Chami, and one son, Dinuk L. B.

In October 2018 the Asgiriya Chapter of Siam Nikaya conferred the title of Shasanamamaka Jana Prasadini on Kiriella, in recognition of his service to Buddhism and society.

Controversies

Central Expressway Construction 
Central expressway of Sri Lanka (E04 expressway) planned to construct in four phases to link Kadawatha to Kandy. However, the construction of phase one and phase three were delayed as Chinese and Japanese loans weren't receiving on time. Phase two of the project (Mirigama to Katugastota) funded by the Sri Lankan government and construction carrying out by local constructors. There are some allegations that phase two construction carrying out by companies attached to Kiriella. COPE decided to investigate tender procedure of central expressway project due to allegations of misappropriation of public funds. And MP. Anura Kumara Dissanayake mentioned in parliament recalling a statement by former president Maithripala Sirisena that tender procedures has been violated while offering contracts. Responding to media, minister of parliament Wimal Weerawansa blamed that former minister Kiriella and his daughter converted central expressway project into their money making venture.

Recruiting Political Supporters to RDA 
Presidential Commission of Inquiry (PCoI) probing corruption in good governance (Yahapalana ) government conducted inquiry on backdoor appointments given by former minister to UNP supporters. He was accused for recruiting UMP members as public liaison officers and consultants to the Road Development Authority (RDA) without conducting interviews, checking qualifications and assigning duties. Former minister denied allegations that those recruitments cost Rs. 62.87 million to government.

References

External links
Biographies of Member of Parliament
Right Royal rally of old Royalists in     the Sri Lanka Parliament

Sports ministers of Sri Lanka
Samagi Jana Balawegaya politicians
United National Party politicians
Sri Lankan Buddhists
Alumni of Royal College, Colombo
Alumni of Sri Lanka Law College
Members of the 9th Parliament of Sri Lanka
Members of the 10th Parliament of Sri Lanka
Members of the 11th Parliament of Sri Lanka
Members of the 12th Parliament of Sri Lanka
Members of the 13th Parliament of Sri Lanka
Members of the 14th Parliament of Sri Lanka
Members of the 15th Parliament of Sri Lanka
Members of the 16th Parliament of Sri Lanka
Living people
1948 births
Higher education ministers of Sri Lanka
Sinhalese politicians